Najwan Darwish; born December 8, 1978 in Jerusalem, is an Arabic-language poet. The New York Review of Books has described him as "one of the foremost Arabic-language poets of his generation".

In 2014, NPR included his book Nothing More To Lose as one of the best books of the year. In 2009, Hay Festival Beirut pronounced him one of the 39 best Arab writers under the age of 40.

Named as "one of Arabic literature’s biggest new stars," Darwish's work has been translated into over 20 languages.

Career 
Besides being a prominent poet, Darwish is a leading cultural editor in the Arab world. He has played an important role in developing Arabic cultural journalism by co-founding independent magazines and mainstream daily newspapers, as well as being a sharp critic. He was the chief editor of Min Wa Ila (From/To) Magazine in Palestine, and the cultural critic for Al Akhbar newspaper in Lebanon from 2006 to 2012, amongst other key positions in cultural journalism. In 2014 he became the founding chief editor of the cultural section of Al Araby Al Jadeed (The New Arab), a major pan-Arab daily newspaper based in London. 

Darwish is active in diverse media, culture and art projects in Palestine and the Arab world. He was the literary advisor of MASARAT Palestine, the Palestinian Cultural and Artistic Year in Belgium (2007-2008) alongside the late Palestinian poet Mahmoud Darwish who was the head of the committee. He is the literary advisor to the Palestine Festival of Literature (PalFest).

Darwish is a speaker and lecturer. Past lectures include "The Sexual Image of Israel in the Arab Imagination" at Homeworks (Beirut, 2008) and "To Be a Palestinian Intellectual After Oslo" at the House of Culture (Oslo, 2009).
In 2022 he adheres to the Empathic Movement (Empathism).

Critical reception 

Issa J. Boullata, the  acclaimed critic, described Darwish's work as "a welcome change in poetic writing in Arabic".

"...A voice simultaneously so passionate and so matter-of-fact that it stops the breath."
-Amal El-Mohtar, Nothing More To Lose' Forges A Connection To Palestine, NPR

“I’ve seen nothing of what I believed, but if a God exists it is the same God for me and for the Palestinian poet Najwan Darwish.”-Raúl Zurita, Paradise in Zurita, Prairie Schooner

"...This wide range of voices is behind much of Darwish's remarkable success as a poet: no Palestinian has ever written poetry quite like this before."
-Kareem James Abu-Zeid, translator of Nothing More to Lose, No Palestinian Has Ever Written Poetry Quite Like This Before, ArabLit

"Resistance is constant in the blood and in the memory --- but this poetry, ferocious as it can be, is also a lyrical, human acceptance of the antagonist, of the antagonists -- even those, for evil never sleeps, of the very own party, on the very own Soil. Such poetry does not play games, linguistic, critical, theoretical, does not address itself to the academies, but goes straight to the heart, straight to the point. And, on every page, in every line, the Lyric voice, the moving, self-questioning power, predominates."-Nathaniel Tarn, TO: Najwan Darwish, Lute & Drum

"I should warn you, perhaps, imaginary reader whose life differs so much from mine — whatever your views, politics, past experiences or lack of them — it will be impossible, by the time you have finished reading this collection, to escape a connection to Palestine." 
-Amal El-Mohtar, Nothing More To Lose' Forges A Connection To Palestine, NPR

"...One of Arabic literature’s biggest new stars." 
-Sarah Irving, The edgily modern poetry of Najwan Darwish, Electronic Intifada

“While his poetry is at times political, it embodies a universal message reminiscent of the great mystical poetry like Rumi.” -Emily Dische-Becker, Najwan Darwish, Poetry International

"Unlike Mahmoud Darwish, Najwan Darwish’s poems on the Palestinian-Israeli conflict venture beyond the quiet meditation or elegy [...] Darwish stretches Rimbaud’s idea into ethnic identity. At various times, the speaker identifies as not only Palestinian but Kurd, Amazigh, Armenian, Arab, Sephardic Jew, Syrian, and Ancient Egyptian, to name a few, encompassing diaspora groups across ethnicities, religions, histories, and nationalities." 
-Eric Dean Wilson, Nothing More to Lose by Najwan Darwish, The Rumpus

"Darwish unfolds his identity—personal and collective, Arab and universal. His poetry, like his city of birth Jerusalem, reveals a composite of histories. The people and places they contain seem to possess undisclosed details, and as readers uncover them piece by piece, they reveal a tapestry only Darwish could have woven." -Nathalie Handal,
Kareem James Abu-Zeid: A Search for Justice and Expansive Identities by Nathalie Handal, Guernica Mag

"What Najwan Darwish is giving us here is an attempt at a new definition both of resistance and of what it means to be an Arab. The term Arab here is expanded seemingly indefinitely to include Kurds, Armenians, Iranians, Turks, etc. But this politics of inclusion does not shy away from decrying injustices." -Kareem James Abu-Zeid,
Kareem James Abu-Zeid: A Search for Justice and Expansive Identities by Nathalie Handal, Guernica Mag

"The dynamic range of atmospheres, emotions, ideas, and perspectives with which Darwish engages in Nothing More to Lose does much to do justice to the complex, liminal body Palestine."
-Adam Day, The Body Palestine: A Review of Najwan Darwish's Nothing More To Lose, Kenyon Review

Selected books 
 Exhausted on the Cross, Translated by Kareem James Abu-Zeid, Foreword by Raul Zurita, NYRB 2021.

 No eres poeta en Granada with Cristina Osorio, Sonambulos Ediciones 2018
 Durmiendo en Gaza Valparaíso México 2017, Traducción de Alí Calderón, Diana Sofía Calderón
 Nada más que perder Valparaíso Ediciones España 2016, Traducción Juan José Vélez Otero. 
 Nothing More To Lose New York Review of Books, New York, 2014. Translated by Kareem James Abu-Zeid.
  Sleeping in Gaza, The Chinese University Press, Hong Kong, 2016
 Je me lèverai un jour Al-Feel Publications, Jerusalem, 2012. Translated by Antoine Jockey. 
 Fabrications Al-Feel Publications, Jerusalem, 2013. Translated into English by Sousan Hammad. Translated into Spanish by Beverly Perez Rego

Selected anthologies 
 In Ramallah, Running By Guy Mannes-Abbott, Black Dog Publishing, London, 2012. . 
 Printemps Arabes, Le Souffle et les Mots By Gilles Kraemer & Alain Jauson, Riveneuve Editions, France, 2012. .
 Voix Vives de Méditerranée en Méditerranée, Anthologie Sète 2011 Éditions Bruno Doucey, Paris, 2011. . 
 Revolutionary Poets Brigade Edited by Jack Hirschman, Caza de Poesia, California, 2010
 Beirut39 Bloomsbury Publishing, London, 2010
 Wherever I Lie Is Your Bed (Two Lines World Writing in Translation) Edited by Margaret Jull Costa and Marilyn Hacker, Center for the Art of Translation, San Francisco, 2009. .
 Language for A New Century, Contemporary Poetry from the Middle East, Asia, and Beyond By Tina Chang. W. W. Norton & Company, New York, 2008. . 
 Le Poème Palestinien Contemporain, Le Taillis Pré, Belgium, 2008
 Palabras Por la Lectura Edited by Javier Pérez Iglesias, Castilla-La Mancha, Spain, 2007
 Pères by Taysir Batniji, with texts by Catherine David and Najwan Darwish, Loris Talmart, Paris, 2007. . 
 En Tous Lieux Nulle Part Ici: Une Anthologie Edited by Henri Deluy, Le Blue Ciel, Coutras, 2006. .

Interviews 
Throughout his two decades long literary career Darwish has rarely given interviews. When he was asked by the Polish magazine Katowice about this he responded with, “I say what I want to say in my poems. My true self is in them.”

Further interviews include: 
 On poetry, tradition, risk-taking, and colonial barbarians by Manash Firaq Bhattacharjee, Al Jazeera
 Poetic justice: The writer Najwan Darwish on PalFest and his first volume of poetry, The National UAE, May 27, 2013 by Jessica Holland
 Six Poems in Translation by Najwan Darwish in Cordite Poetry Review
 Translating Najwan Darwish: 'Are there any more to come? or 'oh give me more!', ArabLit

Videos 
 PEN America: Translation Slam: Najwan Darwish
 Poetry Jam / Impatience from Najwan Darwish's Nothing More to Lose
 Najwan Darwish: Jerusalem, Poetry International 
 14 June 2012- Najwan Darwish, Karen Solie, Tomaz Salamun, Poetry International 
 Najwan Darwish, lectură la FILB 2014 (Festivalul Internațional de Literatură de la București (FILB)

References 

1978 births
Living people
International Writing Program alumni
21st-century Palestinian poets